Robert Veitch Donaldson (20 August 1922 – 2011) was a Scottish footballer who played for Dumbarton and Cowdenbeath.

Donaldson died in Midlothian in 2011, at the age of 89.

References

1922 births
2011 deaths
Scottish footballers
Dumbarton F.C. players
Cowdenbeath F.C. players
Scottish Football League players
Association football midfielders